The M85 is a short metropolitan route in Johannesburg, South Africa.

Route 
The M85 begins at the M9 and ends at the R564.

References 

Streets and roads of Johannesburg
Metropolitan routes in Johannesburg